Wisconsin Dells station is an Amtrak intercity train station in Wisconsin Dells, Wisconsin, served by Amtrak's daily Empire Builder. Despite the antiquated appearance, the station was built in 1989. The station is a replica of a former Chicago, Milwaukee, St. Paul and Pacific Railroad (Milwaukee Road) depot, and is in close proximity to a tourist railroad called the Riverside and Great Northern Railway. The previous station on this site was damaged by a Soo Line Railroad freight train derailing in 1982 (although the depot belonged to the Milwaukee Road then; the Soo Line did not merge with the Milwaukee until 1986.) A nonprofit group was created in the town in order to raise funds for the current station building.

Although there is an employee that opens and closes the station around train times, there is no full station master selling tickets or handling baggage at this station.  Persons wishing to board the train in Wisconsin Dells who do not yet have tickets may purchase them from the conductor upon boarding.

Wisconsin Dells station is served by the daily Empire Builder round trip and beginning in 2024 will also serve an additional Chicago-Twin Cities round trip via the new TCMC route. The station is also slated to serve additional trains with connections to Madison and Eau Claire by 2035.

Statistics

References

External links 

 Wisconsin Dells Amtrak Station (USA Rail Guide -- Train Web)

Amtrak stations in Wisconsin
Wisconsin Dells, Wisconsin
Former Chicago, Milwaukee, St. Paul and Pacific Railroad stations
Railway stations in the United States opened in 1989
1989 establishments in Wisconsin